Gouin Boulevard (officially in ) is the longest street on the Island of Montreal, stretching  across the north side of the island from Senneville in the west to Pointe-aux-Trembles in the east, where it intersects with Sherbrooke Street (Quebec Route 138).

Overview 
Through most of its length, it parallels the Riviere des Prairies that separates Montreal from Laval (Île Jésus). Beginning in the west at the Montreal/Senneville border on Anse-à-l'Orme Road, the boulevard crosses the boroughs and neighbourhoods of Pierrefonds, Sainte-Geneviève, Roxboro, Saraguay, Cartierville, Ahuntsic, Montréal-Nord,  Rivière-des-Prairies, and Pointe-aux-Trembles. It is named after Lomer Gouin, Premier of Quebec from 1905 to 1920.

Many sections of the street feature bicycle lanes that are part of Quebec's Route Verte network. However, several sections have been criticized as dangerous, due to the presence of hydro poles in the lanes. The road has been voted the worst road in Quebec several times.

History 
What is now Gouin Boulevard was first started in 1731, as part of the Chemin du Roy, the oldest highway in Canada. It first opened between 1734 and 1777, serving settlements that had started to be established at the end of the 17th century. In 1910, the portion of the Chemin du Roy on Montreal Island was renamed to "Gouin" in honour of politician Lomer Gouin (1861-1929), a premier of Quebec, by the District and County of Montreal.

Much of the boulevard was affected during the 2017 Quebec floods.

Gallery

References

Streets in Montreal
L'Île-Bizard–Sainte-Geneviève
Pierrefonds-Roxboro
Ahuntsic-Cartierville
Montréal-Nord
Rivière-des-Prairies–Pointe-aux-Trembles